20th Century Animation (originally known as Fox Family Films, Fox Animation Studios, and 20th Century Fox Animation and sometimes referred to as Fox Animation) is an American animation studio located in Century City, Los Angeles. Formed in 1994, it is organized as a division and label of 20th Century Studios (formerly 20th Century Fox), a subsidiary of the Walt Disney Studios, and is tasked with producing animated feature-length films.  At one point, 20th Century Animation had two subsidiaries: Fox Animation Studios, which was shut down on June 26, 2000, and Blue Sky Studios (the latter became the primary unit of 20th Century Animation), which was closed on April 10, 2021. Walt Disney Studios Home Entertainment distributes the films produced by 20th Century Animation in home media under the 20th Century Home Entertainment banner.

The studio has produced a total of 30 feature films (6 films as Fox Family Films, 3 films from Fox Animation Studios, 13 feature films from Blue Sky Studios, and 8 original films), most of them being distributed by 20th Century Studios. Their first film was Mighty Morphin Power Rangers: The Movie and their first animated film was Anastasia, with the most recent release being Night at the Museum: Kahmunrah Rises Again.

Anastasia (1997-1999), Ice Age (2002-present) and Rio (2011-present) are the studio's most commercially successful franchises, while Robots (2005), The Simpsons Movie (2007), Horton Hears a Who! (2008), The Book of Life (2014), The Peanuts Movie (2015), Spies in Disguise (2019), Ron's Gone Wrong (2021) and The Bob's Burgers Movie (2022) are among its most critically praised films.

Background
Before 20th Century Fox started its animation division, Fox released its first seven animated films, such as Hugo the Hippo (1975), Wizards, Raggedy Ann & Andy: A Musical Adventure (1977), Fire and Ice (1983), FernGully: The Last Rainforest (1992) Once Upon a Forest (1993) and The Pagemaster (1994).

In May 1993, Fox agreed to a two-year first-look deal with Nickelodeon for family films. The deal would mostly include original material, though a Nickelodeon executive did not rule out the possibility of making films based on The Ren & Stimpy Show, Rugrats and Doug. However, no films came out of the deal due to the 1994 acquisition of Paramount Pictures by Nickelodeon's parent company, Viacom, and they would distribute the film projects instead.

History

1994–1998: Formation and early years
The division initially started in February 1994 as Fox Family Films, as one of four film divisions of 20th Century Fox under executive John Matoian. The division was planned to produce six feature films a year as part of a plan to produce more films per year overall. Fox senior vice president of production Chris Meledandri was transferred into the unit as executive vice president in March 1994 after having been hired the previous year. The week of May 6, 1994, Fox Family announced the hiring of Don Bluth and Gary Goldman for a new $100 million animation studio which began construction that year in Phoenix, Arizona. In three years, the animation studio would produce and release its first film, Anastasia. In September 1994, Matoian was promoted by Rupert Murdoch to head up the Fox network. Meledandri was selected to head up the unit in 1994.

It produced live-action films such as Mighty Morphin Power Rangers: The Movie (1995), Dunston Checks In (1996) and Home Alone 3. By August 1997, Fox Family had decreased the number of live films. R.L. Stine agreed with Fox Family Films in January 1998 for a film adaptation of the Goosebumps book franchise with Tim Burton producing.

1997–2020: 20th Century Fox Animation, Fox Animation Studios and success with Blue Sky Studios
In August 1997, Fox's Los Angeles-based visual effects company, VIFX, acquired majority interest in Blue Sky Studios to form a new visual effects and animation company, temporarily renamed "Blue Sky/VIFX". Blue Sky had previously did the character animation of MTV Films' first film Joe's Apartment. Following the studio's expansion, Blue Sky produced character animation for the films Alien Resurrection, A Simple Wish, Mouse Hunt, Star Trek: Insurrection and Fight Club. VIFX was later sold to another VFX studio Rhythm and Hues Studios in March 1999. According to Blue Sky founder Chris Wedge, Fox considered selling Blue Sky as well by 2000 due to financial difficulties in the visual effects industry in general.

In 1998, following the success of Anastasia, the division was renamed to Fox Animation Studios, refocusing on animated feature films, including stop-motion, mixed media and digital production. The division's live action films in development at the time included Marvel Comics' Silver Surfer, the disaster film spoof Disaster Area, Fantastic Voyage and Goosebumps. The 1998 film Ever After, a Cinderella adaptation, was the division's last live action film. At this time, there were several animated films on the company's development slate: Dark Town with Henry Selick, Chris Columbus and Sam Hamm, Santa Calls at Blue Sky, and Matt Groening (The Simpsons), Steve Oedekerk and Joss Whedon (Buffy the Vampire Slayer) projects. The Phoenix studio at the time was producing Planet Ice expected in 1999 and directed by Art Vitello and Anastasia producer/directors Don Bluth and Gary Goldman's then soon to be announced project. Chris Meledandri remained as the president of the division, which was known by 1999 as 20th Century Fox Animation. The only television series that the Phoenix studio produced was Adventures from the Book of Virtues, which was a co-production between Fox Animation Studios and PorchLight Entertainment; that series would air on PBS between 1996 and December 2000.

20th Century Fox Animation vice president of physical production Chuck Richardson was sent in early December 1999 to Fox subsidiary Blue Sky Studios as general manager and senior vice president. Richardson was sent to prepare Blue Sky for feature animation production.

The Phoenix studio, which kept the Fox Animation Studios name, laid off 2/3 of its employee workforce in February 2000 before its closure in late June of that year, ten days after Titan A.E. was released and six months before Adventures from the Book of Virtues aired its final episode. Fox Animation looked to produce films at Blue Sky and its Los Angeles headquarters.

Chris Wedge, film producer Lori Forte, and Meledandri presented Fox with a script for a comedy feature film titled Ice Age. Studio management pressured staff to sell their remaining shares and options to Fox on the promise of continued employment on feature-length films. The studio moved to White Plains NY and started production on Ice Age. As the film wrapped, Fox, having little faith in the film, feared that it might bomb at the box office, terminated half of the production staff, and tried unsuccessfully to find a buyer for the film and the studio. Instead, Ice Age, Blue Sky's first feature film, was released by Fox in conjunction with 20th Century Fox Animation on March 15, 2002 with financial success and critical acclaim, receiving a nomination for an Academy Award for Best Animated Feature at the 75th Academy Awards in 2003. Ice Age would subsequently spawn a successful franchise and launch Blue Sky into producing feature films and into becoming a household name in feature animation.

In January 2007, Meledandri left for Universal Pictures to set up Illumination there with Vanessa Morrison as his replacement while answering to newly appointed 20th Century Fox Film Group vice chairman Hutch Parker. Morrison moved from the live action division where she handled family-children fare as senior vice president of production. Morrision was making deal with outside producers like she approved a stop-motion adaptation of Roald Dahl's Fantastic Mr. Fox.

In September 2017, Locksmith Animation formed a multi-year production deal with 20th Century Fox, who would distribute Locksmith's films, with Locksmith aiming to release a film every 12–18 months. Fox Animation was later brought on to oversee the deal, which was to bolster Blue Sky's output and replace the loss of distributing DreamWorks Animation films, which are now owned and distributed by Universal Pictures.

On October 30, 2017, Morrison was named president of a newly created 20th Century Fox division, Fox Family, which has a mandate similar to Fox Animation when it was called Fox Family Films. Andrea Miloro and Robert Baird were named co-president of Fox Animation the same day and would also have direct oversight of Blue Sky and oversee the Locksmith Animation deal and grow Fox Animation with other partnerships and producer deals.

2019–present: Disney era, renaming and closure of Blue Sky Studios
On October 18, 2018, it was announced that Fox Animation would be added alongside 20th Century Fox to the Walt Disney Studios following their acquisition, with co-presidents Andrea Miloro and Robert Baird retaining leadership while reporting to Walt Disney Studios Chairman, Alan Horn and Twentieth Century Fox vice chairman Emma Watts.

On March 21, 2019, Disney announced that Fox Animation (including Blue Sky Studios) would be integrated as new units within the Walt Disney Studios with Co-presidents Andrea Miloro and Robert Baird continuing to lead the studio reporting directly to Alan Horn. Miloro step down as co-president in late July 2019. In August 2019, Walt Disney Animation Studios head Andrew Millstein was named as co-president of Blue Sky for day-to-day operations alongside Baird, while Pixar Animation Studios president Jim Morris would also be taking a supervisory role over Millstein. With the Disney take over, the Locksmith deal left 20th Century Fox for Warner Bros. in October 2019 except for the first and now only film under the deal, Ron's Gone Wrong.

With the August 2019 20th Century Fox slate overhaul announcement, projects from 20th Century Fox franchises such as Night at the Museum, Diary of the Wimpy Kid, and Ice Age were announced for the then-upcoming Disney+ streaming service. These projects would later be announced during Disney's Investor Day in December 2020 as animated feature films for the aforementioned streaming service. The first of these projects was an animated reboot of Diary of a Wimpy Kid, which was released on December 3, 2021 under Walt Disney Pictures.

On January 17, 2020, Disney dropped the "Fox" name from the two main film studio units acquired from 21st Century Fox—20th Century Fox and Fox Searchlight Pictures, while there were no mention of changes to other lesser-known feature film units. Fox Animation took on its current name on his incorporation on January 28, 2020 to avoid confussion with Fox Corporation.

On February 9, 2021, Disney announced that it was shutting down Blue Sky Studios in April 2021, the main unit of 20th Century Animation. It closed on April 10, 2021.

Process
Unlike animation studios such as Pixar or Walt Disney Animation Studios, 20th Century Animation does not act as a typical animation studio, but rather as a division and somewhat of a distribution label for animated films that are made under or acquired by 20th Century Studios. An example of this is with Fox Animation Studios and Blue Sky Studios' films; both of which were subsidiaries of the company. Another example of this is Fantastic Mr. Fox. Additionally, Ron's Gone Wrong was the first and only film made under a deal between 20th Century and Locksmith Animation.

However, the animation production of 20th Century Animation's films (except for Blue Sky Studios) is outsourced to other studios. For example, The Simpsons Movie was animated at Film Roman alongside AKOM and Rough Draft Studios, while Ron's Gone Wrong was animated by DNEG. The Book of Life was developed outside of 20th Century Animation at Reel FX, with the studio co-producing the film later on. Diary of a Wimpy Kid and The Ice Age Adventures of Buck Wild were animated by Bardel Entertainment.

Fox Animation Studios (headquartered in Phoenix, Arizona) and Blue Sky Studios (headquartered in White Plains, New York and later Greenwich, Connecticut) animated their respective films internally, however Anastasia and Titan A.E. were outsourced to multiple animation studios, including Bardel Entertainment, Reality Check Studios, and Blue Sky, when the latter of the three was still a VFX studio.

Both Fox Animation Studios and Blue Sky had their own unique animation style, with the former having the same animation style as Don Bluth.

Filmography

Fox Family Films

Fox Animation Studios

From 1994 to 2000, Fox operated Fox Animation Studios, a traditional animation studio which was started to compete with Walt Disney Animation Studios, which was experiencing great success with films such as The Little Mermaid, Beauty and the Beast, Aladdin and The Lion King. The Fox studio, however, was not as successful. Their first feature Anastasia made nearly $140 million at the worldwide box office on a $53 million budget in 1997, but their next feature, Titan A.E., was a large financial loss, losing $100 million for 20th Century Fox in 2000. The lack of box office success, coupled with the rise of computer animation, led Fox to shut down the studios.

Blue Sky Studios

From 1997 until 2021, Fox owned Blue Sky Studios, a computer animation company known for the Ice Age franchise. Fox has had much more success with the studio, with the box office receipts of their films becoming competitive with the likes of Pixar and DreamWorks Animation. On March 21, 2019, Blue Sky Studios was integrated as a separate unit within Walt Disney Studios, yet they would continue to report to Fox Animation presidents Andrea Miloro and Robert Baird. In February 2021, Disney had announced that Blue Sky would cease all operations and close sometime within April 2021, eventually shuttering on April 10, 2021.

Blue Sky released thirteen feature films, numerous short films and television specials. Ice Age: Dawn of the Dinosaurs is the studio's highest-grossing film. Major feature films include:

Co-productions and original films
Starting in 2007, 20th Century Animation occasionally produces their own films without Blue Sky Studios' involvement while also co-producing films from other studios. The company is not credited on these films like how they are with Blue Sky's films and Fox Animation Studios' Anastasia and Titan A.E. As of 2022, The Simpsons Movie remains their highest-grossing original film.

All films listed are produced and or distributed by 20th Century Studios unless noted otherwise.

In development 

Combines live-action with animation.

Television specials

Short films

Related productions
All films list are distributed by 20th Century Studios unless noted otherwise.

Unproduced films

Franchises
This list does not include follow-up films not produced by 20th Century Animation

Accolades

Academy Awards

Annie Awards

British Animation Awards

Golden Globe Awards

See also
 Fox Animation Studios
 Blue Sky Studios
 20th Television Animation
 List of 20th Century Studios theatrical animated feature films
 List of Disney theatrical animated feature films
 Walt Disney Animation Studios
 Pixar
 Terrytoons

Notes

References

Animation
1994 establishments in California
American companies established in 1994
Mass media companies established in 1994
Disney acquisitions
Disney production studios
American animation studios
Fox animation
Walt Disney Studios (division)
Former News Corporation subsidiaries
Century City, Los Angeles
Companies based in Los Angeles